Molorchus umbellatarum is a species of longhorn beetles in the tribe Molorchini.  It is found throughout Europe including southern Britain.

Taxonomy and nomenclature
This species is often known by the synonym Glaphyra umbellatarum and may be called the "Pear Shortwing Beetle".  It is placed in the subgenus Molorchus and is the type species in its genus under the basionym Necydalis umbellatarum Schreber, 1759. This species has two varieties:
 M. umbellatarum var. diversipes Pic, 1897
 M. umbellatarum var. minimus (Scopoli, 1763)

Biology
Besides feeding on pears, M. umbellatarum is known to consume: Castanea sativa (Sweet Chestnut), Viburnum opulus (Guelder rose), Frangula alnus (Alder Buckthorn), Euonymus europaeus (Spindle) and Cornus mas.  Known parasitoids  include Xorides indicatorius.

References

External links
 
 

Cerambycinae
Beetles of Europe